Nephropsis atlantica, sometimes called the scarlet lobsterette or scarlet clawed lobster, is a species of lobster from the Atlantic Ocean.

Description
The eyes are unpigmented, in contrast to shallow-water species, and the carapace, abdomen and chelae are covered in setae (bristles).

Distribution
Nephropsis atlantica is found on muddy substrates in deep waters of the eastern Atlantic Ocean, from the Faroe Islands to Namibia. It is one of only three clawed lobsters in the north-east Atlantic Ocean (the others being Homarus gammarus and Nephrops norvegicus), and the only one which is not the subject of commercial fishery.

Taxonomy
Nephropsis atlantica was first described by the Reverend Canon Alfred Merle Norman in a report sent to Charles Wyville Thomson in 1880, and published in the Proceedings of the Royal Society of Edinburgh in 1882. The report was one of several published simultaneously on the various organisms dredged up by the ship Knight Errant in the Faroe–Shetland Channel. Norman's report opens "I send a list; it is a very interesting one", and goes on to detail species known from previous expeditions to the North Atlantic and three new species – Ampelisca compacta (Amphipoda: Ampeliscidae), Halirages elegans (Amphipoda: Calliopiidae) and Nephropsis atlantica.

Notes

References

True lobsters
Crustaceans of the Atlantic Ocean
Crustaceans described in 1882